GRT Institute of Engineering and Technology is an engineering college in Tiruvallur, Tamil Nadu, India. The college is affiliated to Anna University, Chennai.

History
BKR College of Engineering and Technology was founded in 2008 and is now managed by GRT Group of Educational Institutions. The college offered undergraduate and post graduate courses in engineering and management. It is a self-financing college affiliated to Anna University, Chennai and approved by AICTE.

Courses offered

Undergraduate courses

B.E. Civil Engineering
B.E. Computer Science and Engineering
B.E. Electrical and Electronics Engineering
B.E. Electronics and Communication Engineering
B.E. Mechanical Engineering
B.E. Bio Medical Engineering
B.E. Civil Engineering
B.E. Automobile Engineering

Postgraduate courses

 Master of Business Administration
 M.E. Communication & Networking
 M.E. Manufacturing Engineering

Facilities
Scholarship
Library
Laboratories
Auditorium
Medical facilities
Transportation
Sports

References

Engineering colleges in Tamil Nadu
Educational institutions established in 2008
Colleges affiliated to Anna University
2008 establishments in Tamil Nadu